Adeuomphalus sinuosus is a species of sea snail, a marine gastropod mollusc, unassigned to family in the superfamily Seguenzioidea.

References

External links
  Serge GOFAS, Ángel A. LUQUE, Joan Daniel OLIVER,José TEMPLADO & Alberto SERRA (2021) - The Mollusca of Galicia Bank (NE Atlantic Ocean); European Journal of Taxonomy 785: 1–114
 To Encyclopedia of Life
 To World Register of Marine Species

sinuosus
Gastropods described in 1925